Bebearia chriemhilda is a butterfly in the family Nymphalidae. It is found along the coasts of Kenya and Tanzania. The habitat consists of coastal forests.

The larvae feed on Hyphaene species. Adults are attracted to fermenting fruit.

References

Butterflies described in 1896
chriemhilda
Butterflies of Africa
Taxa named by Otto Staudinger